Rudy VanderLans (born 1955, Voorburg) is a Dutch graphic designer, photographer, and the co-founder of Emigre Fonts with his wife Zuzana Licko. Emigre Fonts is an independent type foundry in Berkeley, CA. He was also the art director and editor of Emigre magazine, the legendary journal devoted to visual communications from 1984 to 2005. Since arriving in California in 1981, he has been photographing his adoptive Golden State as an ongoing side project. He has authored a total of 11 photo books on the topic, and staged two solo exhibits at Gallery 16 in San Francisco.

Education and graphic design

VanderLans studied graphic design at the Royal Academy of Art in the Hague (KABK) and graduated in 1979. He worked as an apprentice designer at Wim Crouwel's Total Design in Amsterdam and as a junior designer at Form Vijf and Tel Design in The Hague. In 1981, he moved to California and studied photography at the University of California, Berkeley where he met Licko.

VanderLans was first introduced to type design while at KABK, where the well-known Dutch type designer and teacher Gerrit Noordzij had started an ambitious and influential type and lettering program in 1970. When asked in 2001 for a contribution to a Noordzij tribute, VanderLans wrote: “Noordzij is a very distant memory for me. Although any wisdom regarding type that I carry with me must have come from him.

From 1983–85, he worked as a graphic designer and illustrator in the art department at the San Francisco Chronicle newspaper.

VanderLans has received honorary Doctor of Arts degrees from Rhode Island School of Design (2004) and California Institute of the Arts in Valencia, California (2005).

Emigre

From 1984 until 2005 VanderLans published, edited, and designed Emigre magazine, a quarterly publication devoted to visual communication and known for its inclusion of design discourse. Andrew Blauvelt, whose writing often occurred in the magazine, wrote that "Emigre covered emerging graphic designers and typographers seldom profiled in typical industry publications. It also published spirited design criticism in its pages–finding itself to be both the message and the messenger of many debates.”

Licko and VanderLans were early adopters of the personal computer, and Emigres launch coincided with the release of the Macintosh computer. They used the new technology to create some of the very first digital layouts and typeface designs. Their experimental design aesthetics earned them equal amounts of praise and criticism in the 1990s.

Exposure of Zuzana Licko's fonts through the magazine led to VanderLans and Licko founding Emigre Fonts in 1985. VanderLans’ main contribution to Emigre Fonts continue to be his type specimen designs. In a review of the book Emigre Fonts: Type Specimens 1986-2016, critic Kenneth FitzGerald remarked that “Emigre’s specimens are notable for the negotiation of practical considerations and creative idealism—the essence of all graphic design. They demonstrate an adept dovetailing of these concerns, crafting a format that stimulates desire then provides an efficient vehicle for satisfying it. A balance is struck between providing an enthusing context for the type while not overwhelming it. Though far from 'neutral,' the framework is evocative and clear.”

Books
 Emigre (The Book): Graphic Design into the Digital Realm, New York, NY: Van Nostrand Reinhold; John Wiley & Sons, 1993
 Emigre: Rosbeek 43, Charles Nypels Award, 1998, Netherlands: Drukkerij Rosbeek, 1998
 Emigre No.70, Selections from Emigre Magazine #1 – #69, Berkeley, CA: Gingko Press, 2009
 Departures: Five Milestone Font Families by Emigre, Berkeley, CA: Emigre, 2011
 Emigre Fonts: Type Specimens 1986 - 2016, Berkeley, CA: Gingko Press, 2016

Photography

As a parallel interest to his design ventures, VanderLans has been photographing the California environment since he moved there from the Netherlands in 1981. He has authored a total of eleven photo books on the topic, and staged two solo exhibits at Gallery 16 in San Francisco.Photography books Positively Palmtree, small artist book created as an artist in residence at the Visual Studies Workshop in Rochester NY, 1985.
 Picture the Southwest, small artist book, part of Emigre No. 7, 1987.
 Palm Desert, Berkeley, CA: Emigre, 1999
 Cucamonga, Berkeley, CA: Emigre, 2000
 Joshua Tree, Berkeley, CA: Emigre, 2001
 Supermarket, Berkeley, CA: Gingko Press, 2001
 Pages from an Imaginary Book, Paris, France, Onestar Press, 2003
 Bagdad, Californie, Berkeley, Rodez, France, Éditions du Rouergue, 2004
 Still Lifes, California, 2015
 Still Lifes, U.S.A., Berkeley, CA: Gingko Press, 2017
 Still Lifes, Tokyo, Berkeley, CA: Gingko Press, 2018
 Anywhere, California, Berkeley, CA: Gingko Press, 2020
 Oleander Sunset, Berkeley, CA: Gingko Press, 2021

Awards
 MacUser Desktop Publisher of the Year Award, 1986
 Chrysler Award for Innovation in Design, 1994
 Publish Magazine Impact Awards, 1996
 American Institute of Graphic Arts Gold Medal Award, 1997
 Charles Nypels Award for Excellence in Typography, 1998
 Honorary members of the Society of Typographic Arts, Chicago, 2010
 Society of Typographic Aficionados Annual Typography Award, 2013
 29th New York Type Directors Club Medal, 2016

Museum exhibitsSolo exhibitions “Emigre Magazine: Selections from the Permanent Collection,” Museum of Modern Art, San Francisco, 1997
 “Charles Nypels Prize,” Jan van Eyck Academy, Maastricht, Netherlands, 1998
 “Emigre in Istanbul,” Contemporary Art Center, Istanbul, Turkey, 1999
 “Emigre in Norfolk,” Old Dominion University Gallery, Norfolk, Virginia, 2005
 “Emigre at Gallery 16,” Gallery 16, San Francisco, 2010
 “Emigre magazine: design, discourse and authorship,” University of Reading, UK, 2017General exhibitions “Pacific Wave: California Graphic Design,” Museo Fortuny, Venice, Italy, 1987
 “Graphic Design in America,” Walker Art Center, Minneapolis, 1989
 “Mixing Messages: Graphic Design in Contemporary Culture,” Cooper-Hewitt National Design Museum, 1996
 “Designer as Author, Voices and Visions,” Northern Kentucky University, 1996
 “Design Culture Now: National Design Triennial,” Cooper-Hewitt National Design Museum, 2000
 “East Coast/West Coast” at Centre du Graphisme, Echirolles, France, 2002
 "D-Day:le design aujourd'hui," at Centre Pompidou, Paris, 2005
 “Digitally Mastered,” MoMA, New York, 2007
 “Quick, Quick, Slow,” Experimentadesign Lisboa 2009, Berardo Collection Museum, Lisbon, Portugal, 2009 (featured Emigre magazine issues10–24)
 “Typographic Tables,” Museum of Modern and Contemporary Art, Bolzano, Italy, 2011
 “Deep Surface: Contemporary Ornament and Pattern,” Contemporary Art Museum, Raleigh, 2011
 “Graphic Design: Now in Production,” Walker Art Center, Minneapolis, 2011 (featured "Emigre No. 70: The Look Back Issue" and Base 900)
 “Postmodernism: Style and Subversion 1970–1990,” Victoria & Albert Museum, London, 2011
 "Standard Deviations," MoMA, New York, 2011 (featured 23 digital typefaces for their permanent collection, including five Emigre font families: Jeffery Keedy's Keedy Sans, Jonathan Barnbrook's Mason Serif, Barry Deck's Template Gothic, Zuzana Licko's Oakland—renamed Lo-Res in 2001—and P. Scott Makela's Dead History)
 “Work from California,” 25th International Biennial of Graphic Design, Brno, Czech Republic, 2012
 “Revolution/Evolution,” College for Creative Studies, Detroit, 2014
 “Typeface to Interface,” Museum of Modern Art, San Francisco, 2016
 “California Graphic Design, 1975–95,” Los Angeles County Museum of Art, Los Angeles, 2018
 “Between the Lines: Typography in LACMA’s Collection,” Los Angeles County Museum of Art, Los Angeles, 2019Permanent collections'''
 Denver Art Museum holds a complete set of Emigre magazine in their permanent collection.
 Design Museum in London holds a complete set of Emigre magazine in their permanent collection.
 Letterform Archive holds the Emigre Archives in their permanent collection.
 Museum für Gestaltung (Museum of Design, Zurich) holds Emigre magazine issues in their permanent collection.
 Museum of Modern Art in New York holds a complete set of Emigre magazine, and five digital fonts from the Emigre Fonts library in their permanent collection.
 Museum of Modern Art in San Francisco holds a complete set of Emigre magazine in their permanent collection.

See also
 List of AIGA medalists
 First Things First 2000 manifesto

References

Additional online resources

 Eye (Website), “Cult of the Ugly,” by Steven Heller, 1993
 Letter to Emigre Magazine, (PDF) by Gunnar Swanson, 1994
 2x4 (Website), “Designer as Author,” by Michael Rock, 1996
SpeakUp (Website), Interview with Rudy VanderLans by Armin Vit, 2002.
 Typotheque (Website), “Context in Critique,” review of Emigre #64, Rant, by Dmitri Siegel, 2004
 Typotheque (Website), “Rudy VanderLans, editor of Emigre,” interview by David Casacuberta and Rosa Llop, 2004
 AIGA (Website), “An Interview with Rudy VanderLans: Still Subversive After All These Years,” by Steven Heller, 2004
 Design Observer (Website), “Emigre: An Ending,” by Rick Poynor, 2005
 TapeOp (Website), “Rudy VanderLans: Emigre No. 69: The End,” review by John Baccigaluppi, 2008
 Eye (Website), “The farewell tour syndrome,” book review by Emily King, 2009
 Communication Arts (Website), “Emigre No.70: The Look Back Issue,” book review by Angelynn Grant, 2009
 Dwell (Website), "Emigre No.70,” book review by Miyoko Ohtake, 2009
 Print (Website), “Emigre’s Lucky Number,” by Steven Heller, 2009
 Print magazine (Website), “Design Couples: Rudy VanderLans and Zuzana Licko," interview by Caitlin Dover, 2010
 Fast Company (Website), “Type Master: An Interview with Emigre’s Rudy VanderLans," by Alissa Walker, 2010. 
 The Atlantic (Website), "Can the Rule-Breaking Font Designers of Three Decades Ago Still Break Rules?,” by Steven Heller, 2012
Plazm Magazine (Website), "In Conversation with Emigre" by Sara Dougher and Joshua Berger, 2013
 Communication Arts (Website), “Emigre Fonts,” book review by Angelynn Grant, 2016
Print (Website), “The Legibility Wars of the ‘80s and ‘90s,” 2016
 AIGA, Eye on Design (Website), “Emigre Type Foundry Pretty Much Designed the ‘90s—Here’s What it Looked Like,” book review by Angela Riechers, 2016
 MyFonts (Website), interview with Zuzana Licko by Jan Middendorp, 2016. 
 Fontstand (Website), “Emigre: Time and Time Again,” by Sébastien Morlighem, 2016
 Klim Type Foundry (Website), “Tilting at windmills,” Rudy vanderLans replies to “Welcome to the infill font foundry,” 2016
 University of Reading (Website), “Emigre magazine: design, discourse and authorship,” an exhibition curated by Francisca Monteiro and Rick Poynor, 2017
 Typography & Graphic Communication (Website), "Emigre magazine: design, discourse and authorship,” exhibition, 2017
 Huffington Post (Website), “One of Today’s Most Popular Fonts Has a Wild Centuries-Long History,” by Maddie Crum, 2017
 ReadyMag Stories (Website), “Emigre,” by Zhdan Philippov and Vitaly Volk, 2020
 “Typography and Legibility: An Analysis of Tschichold, Licko, and VanderLans,” (PDF) by Chaney Boyle, 2020
 MoMA (Website), Emigre Magazine, issues 1-69, permanent collection
 MoMA (Website), Oakland typeface, permanent collection

Additional print resources

 Bouvet, Michel, East Coast West Coast: Graphistes aux États-unis, Paris, France, Les Éditions Textuel, 2002. Essay on history of Emigre.
 Dawson, Peter, The Field Guide to Typography: Typefaces in the Urban Landscape, New York, NY, Prestel, 2013. Interview with Rudy VanderLans & Zuzana Licko.
 Eskilson, Stephen J., Graphic Design: A New History, London, UK, Laurence King Publishing, 2007. Essay on Emigre in chapter on “Postmodern Typography.”
 Heller, Stephen, ed., Design Literacy: Understanding Graphic Design. New York, NY, Allworth Press with School of Visual Arts, 2014. Essay on Emigre in chapter on "Mass Media.”
 Lupton, Ellen, Mixing Messages: Graphic Design in Contemporary Culture, New York, NY, Princeton Architectural Press, 1996. Short profile of Emigre and Zuzana Licko's typefaces. Book published in conjunction with exhibit at Cooper-Hewitt National Design Museum.
 McCarthy, Steven, The Designer as Author, Producer, Activist, Entrepreneur, Curator & Collaborator: New Models for Communicating, Amsterdam, Netherlands, BIS, 2013. Emigre referenced throughout, and short profile of Emigre in chapter on “Typographic Design Authorship.”
 Meggs, Philip B., ed., A History of Graphic Design, New York, NY, John Wiley & Sons, 1998. Profile of Emigre in chapter on “Pioneers of Digital Graphic Design.”
 Poynor, Rick, Design Without Boundaries: Visual Communication in Transition, London, UK, Booth-Clibborn Editions, 1998. Emigre referenced in essay “Cult of the Ugly,” and one essay, “Into the Digital Realm,” on Emigre.
 Poynor, Rick, No More Rules: Graphic Design and Postmodernism, New Haven, CT, Yale University Press, 2003. Emigre referenced throughout.
 Shaughnessy, Adrian, How to be a Graphic Designer, Without Losing Your Soul'', London, UK, Laurence King Publishing, 2005. Interview with Rudy VanderLans.

External links
 Emigre official site
Emigre Archives at Letterform Archive (all issues are available in full online)
Emigre Magazine Index created by Jessica Barness for The Goldstein Museum of Design
Emigre Fonts at Adobe Fonts

1955 births
Living people
Dutch graphic designers
Dutch typographers and type designers
Dutch magazine founders
Design writers
People from Voorburg
University of California, Berkeley alumni
AIGA medalists